Tresigallo is an Italian municipality in the province of Ferrara, which is in the region of Emilia-Romagna.  It has about 4,700 inhabitants.

Despite its medieval origins, to which only a 16th-century palace (Palazzo Pio) of the House of Este bears witness today, it was transformed by the Fascist Minister of Agriculture Edmondo Rossoni, who was born in Tresigallo in 1884. From his ministry in Rome, he developed and supervised the new village map, completely rebuilding it as a utopian city from 1927 to 1934. Two axes were drawn across the town in order to link the main aspects of everyday life: on the horizontal axis there was the Church (spirituality) and the Balilla House, a youth center, renamed Casa della G.I.L (Gioventù Italiana del Littorio); on the vertical axis there was the civic centre (everyday life) and the cemetery (memory).

References

Cities and towns in Emilia-Romagna
Architecture related to utopias